The Belize national beach soccer team represents Belize in international beach soccer competitions and is controlled by the Football Federation of Belize, the governing body for football in Belize.

Current squad

Achievements

CONCACAF Beach Soccer Championship

References

External links
Concacaf.com
Concacaf.com
Concacaf.com

North American national beach soccer teams
National sports teams of Belize